Karel Heřmánek (born 17 October 1947, in Prague) is a Czech actor. He appeared in more than forty films between 1976 and 2008.

Selected filmography

References

External links
 

1947 births
Living people
Male actors from Prague
Czech male film actors
Czech male television actors
Czech male stage actors
Janáček Academy of Music and Performing Arts alumni
Czech male voice actors